Angelique Fawcette is an American producer, CEO, actress, and activist known primarily for her work on Unbelievable!!!!!.

Career
Fawcette is the CEO of and co-owns Archangel Films LA alongside her husband Steven L. Fawcette.

Fawcette produced the Star Trek parody film Unbelievable!!!!!, released in 2016, along with her husband. For the film's soundtrack, she hired the last living composer of the original Star Trek, Gerald Fried, along with a 29-piece orchestra.  Fawcette is both a producer and actress in the film, which also stars over forty Star Trek actors.

Activism
Fawcette is a longtime friend of actress Nichelle Nichols and has objected to the conservatorship petition brought by Nichols' son.  Fawcette has become an activist against conservatorship abuse in cases such as Britney Spears and Nichelle Nichols.

Filmography

Film

Television

References

External links

ARCHANGEL FILMS LA

Living people
African-American film producers
Year of birth missing (living people)
21st-century African-American people